Pusser may refer to:

 Pusser (surname), an American surname
 Ship's pusser, the person on a ship responsible for the handling of money on board

See also

 Pusser's rum